Kurtkulağı is a village in the District of Ceyhan, Adana Province, Turkey. Kurtkulağı Kervansarayı is in the village. There also is a mosque nearby, both stem from the time the Silk Road passed through this village.

References

Villages in Ceyhan District